
A major wildfire occurred from 19 August 1949 to 25 August 1949 in the Landes forest in France.  of forest land were burnt - and 82 people killed. It was considered the most deadly forest fire in Europe until the 2007 and 2018 wildfires in Greece, which killed 84 and 99 people, respectively. Since both fire events in Greece can be distinguished as a multiple fire event, the Landes fire still ranks as the deadliest wildfire in Europe since record-keeping began. The municipalities of Cestas, Saucats, Marcheprime and Mios in the Gironde department were devastated by the forest fire. The very high dead toll from the fire shocked the country – and marked the starting point for the construction of the “Defending Forest against Wildfire” – “Défense de la forêt contre les incendies” System.

Bibliography and further reading
Joan Deville, L'Incendie meurtrier dans la forêt des Landes en août 1949, Les Éd. des Pompiers de France,  15 mai 2009, 160 p. (in French)

Sources 
Abstract and short translation of the Article « Incendie de la forêt des Landes de 1949 » in the French Wikipedia

References

External links  
 Pourquoi les incendies de forêts sont-ils si meurtriers ? Par Robert B Chevrou
 La sécheresse remarquable de l'année agricole 1948-1949 en France.
 Les incendies de forêt dans le massif landais
 1949 - l'incendie meurtrier dans la Forêt des Landes (article in the  blog Paysages)(in French)
  The Fatal Forest Fire – remembering the “1949 Mega fire” in the „Forêt des Landes” (South West France) (article in the  blog Paysages)
  Le 19 août 1949 – le drame de la Forêt des Landes (article in the  blog Paysages)(in French) 

1949 in France 
Wildfire ecology
Landes
History of firefighting
1949 wildfires
1949 fires in Europe
1949 disasters in France